Olajumoke is a Nigerian given name of Yoruba origin that may refer to:
Given name
Olajumoke Adenowo (born 1968), Nigerian architect, entrepreneur, and philanthropist
Olajumoke Bodunrin (born 1945), Nigerian sprinter 
Olajumoke Okoya-Thomas, Nigerian politician
Olajumoke Orisaguna (born 1989), Nigerian model 
Oluwafunmilayo Olajumoke Atilade (born 1952), Nigerian judge 

Surname
Bode Olajumoke, Nigerian politician

Yoruba given names
Yoruba-language surnames